Michael Roeger (born 14 May 1988) is an Australian T46 athletics competitor. He competed at the 2008, 2012,  and 2016 and 2020 Summer Paralympics athletics in middle distance and marathon running events. He has won one gold and three bronze medals at the IPC Athletics World Championships and a bronze medal at the 2016 Rio Paralympics. His gold in the Men's T46 marathon at the 2019 World Para Athletics Championships was held as part of the London Marathon, set a new world record.

Roeger competed at the 2020 Tokyo Paralympics.

Personal
Roeger was born on 14 May 1988, and is from Langhorne Creek
, South Australia.  He has a twin brother Chris. He is missing the lower half of his right arm.  He played junior football at the Langhorne Creek Football Club.  Growing up, he played basketball, table tennis and cricket. He moved away from there and to Canberra in 2009. In 2012, he was a student at the University of Canberra working on a Bachelor of Communications in Advertising and Marketing.

Athletics

Roeger is a T46 classified athlete, competing in 800 metres,1,500 metres and 5,000 metre events. He is a member of the Adelaide area Hills District Athletic Club. In 2008, when in Adelaide, he trained with Pete Davis and Marc Fairhead.  He has held an athletics scholarship with the Australian Institute of Sport. He started competing in athletics in 1999 when he competed for his high school's cross country team.

At the 2008 Victorian Country Championships, Roeger set a Paralympic A qualifying time of 4:02.04 in the 1500 metres.  At the time, this was the second best time ever set in the world.  He also set qualifying times in the 800 metres and 5,000 metres. As a twenty-year-old, he represented Australia at the 2008 Summer Paralympics.  He did not earn a medal at the Games.  He set a personal best time in the 1,500 metre event, finishing in eighth place,  and came 11th place in the final of the 5,000 metres. He did not make the finals in the 800 metre event. He was selected to represent Australia at the 2012 Summer Paralympics in athletics in the 800 metres event. His Paralympic training included five gym sessions a week with a focus on leg strength.  He competed in the Men's 800 m T46 at the 2012 London and but did not medal.

At the 2013 IPC Athletics World Championships in Lyon, France, he won bronze medals in the Men's 1500m and Men's 5000m T46 events.

In 2014, Roeger ran almost a five-second 1500 m personal best (3 minutes 51.08 seconds) on 20 March 2014 at the Victorian Milers Club. His time qualified him for the 2014 Australian Athletics Championships. His time was just short of the world record, 3:50.2 and the second best time in his class. At the Australian Championships, he took on his coach Philo Saunders, who is a physiologist at the Australian Institute of Sport. Also in 2014, he was part of the Australian Sports Commission team that represented Australia at the JP Morgan Chase Corporate Challenge in London, England.

During the Athletics Australia 2014/15 season, he reduced his personal best for the 1500m to 3:50.61. He qualified for the Australian Athletics Championships in Brisbane, Queensland Open 1500m and ran in the heats.

In June 2015 in Boston, United States, Roeger ran 3:48.55 to break the Men's 1500 m T46 world record but it was not ratified as no drug test was available.

At the 2015 IPC Athletics World Championships in Doha, he won the bronze medal in the Men's 1500 m T46. After the event, Roeger said "A bronze medal is a bronze medal, I wanted more from myself today but the legs weren't there in the last lap. It's a stepping stone for Rio. This makes me so hungry for gold. It's my dream and it’s been my dream for a long time. It's about taking the positives away from this and building on them for next year".

On 12 June 2016, Roeger ran 3:49.08 in the Men's 1500m at the Portland Track Festival to break the Men's 1500m T46 world record. The record was not ratified even though drug testing was undertaken.

At the 2016 Rio Paralympics, he won the bronze medal in the Men's 1500 m T46.

On 4 February 2017 at the inaugural Sydney Invitational, Roeger smashed the T46 1500m world record of 3:50.15 by running 3:46.51. Roeger had previously beaten the world record time but previous times were in unsanctioned events.

Roeger was selected to compete at the 2017 World Para Athletics Championships in London, England but withdrew just prior to the competition due to injury.

On 14 October 2018, in his debut marathon, he finished sixth in the Melbourne Marathon. His time 2:23.31 broke the previous world record of 2:26.44 but it was not ratified. After the race Roeger said "I’m over the moon to get the world record and finish on the MCG. It has been 10 years of work really, it is the third world record in the year, it is a pretty special feeling."

At the 2019 London Marathon which was also the 2019 World Para Athletics Championships marathon event, he won the Men's T46 in world record time of 2:22:51 breaking the ratified world record of 2:26.44. After originally being disqualified, he was awarded the silver medal in the Men's 1500 m at the 2019 World Para Athletics Championships  in Dubai. His time was 3m:51.99.

Roeger finished 6th in the Men's Marathon T46 at the 2020 Tokyo Paralympics, his fourth Paralympics. Roeger went into the event as favourite but a stress fracture in his leg in the month leading up to the Games led to a compromised,  preparation and training load coming into Tokyo.

In 2018, he has a scholarship with the South Australian Institute of Sport and trains at the Australian Institute of Sport in Canberra.

At the 2020 Tokyo Paralympics, Roeger competed in the Marathon T46 where he finished sixth.

1500m progression

5000m progression

10000m progression

Marathon progression

Recognition
 2014 – awarded Athletics Australia Male Para-athlete of the Year and his coach Philo Saunders was awarded Australian Sports Commission Para-Athletics Coach of the Year.
 2015 – University of Canberra Coca-Cola Amatil Athlete of the Year and Full Blue Award
 2015 – nominated Athletics Australia Male Para-athlete of the Year.
2016 –  Cosmopolitan Bachelor of the Year finalist
2017– Strathalbyn's Young Citizen of the Year
2018 – awarded Athletics Australia Male Para-athlete of the Year
2019 – International Paralympic Committee Athlete of the Month for April 2019

References

External links
 
 
 Michael Roeger at Australian Athletics Historical Results

Paralympic athletes of Australia
Living people
1988 births
Athletes (track and field) at the 2008 Summer Paralympics
Athletes (track and field) at the 2012 Summer Paralympics
Athletes (track and field) at the 2016 Summer Paralympics
Australian Institute of Sport Paralympic track and field athletes
Athletes (track and field) at the 2020 Summer Paralympics
Paralympic bronze medalists for Australia
Medalists at the 2016 Summer Paralympics
Amputee category Paralympic competitors
Australian amputees
Paralympic medalists in athletics (track and field)
South Australian Sports Institute alumni
Australian male long-distance runners
Australian male marathon runners
21st-century Australian people